Penn & Teller, Penn Jillette and Teller, are American magicians, entertainers, and scientific skeptics who have performed together since the late 1970s. They are noted for their ongoing act that combines elements of comedy with magic.

The duo has been featured in numerous stage and television shows such as Penn & Teller: Fool Us and  currently perform in Las Vegas at The Rio, the longest running headliners to play at the same hotel in Las Vegas history. Penn Jillette serves as the act's orator and raconteur. Teller generally does not speak while performing, and instead communicates through mime and nonverbals, though his voice can occasionally be heard during their live shows and television appearances. Besides magic, the pair has become associated with the advocacy of scientific skepticism and libertarianism, particularly through their television show Penn & Teller: Bullshit!.

Career
Penn and Teller were introduced to each other by Wier Chrisemer, and performed their first show together at the Minnesota Renaissance Festival on August 19, 1975. From the late 1970s through 1981, Penn, Teller, and Chrisemer performed as a trio called "The Asparagus Valley Cultural Society" which played in Philadelphia’s Walnut Street Theater and in San Francisco, California at the Phoenix Theater. Chrisemer helped to develop some bits that continued, most notably Teller's "Shadows" trick, which involves a single red rose. The group disbanded in 1981 after Chrisemer quit show business, leaving Penn Jillette and Teller to work as a pair on a show called "Mrs. Lonsberry's Seance of Horror".

By 1985, Penn & Teller were receiving positive reviews for their Off Broadway show and Emmy Award-winning PBS special, Penn & Teller Go Public. In 1987, they began the first of three Broadway runs. The same year, they appeared as three-card Monte scam artists in the music video for "It's Tricky" by Run-DMC. Through the late 1980s and early 1990s, the duo made numerous television appearances on Late Night with David Letterman and Saturday Night Live, as well as The Tonight Show with Jay Leno, Late Night with Conan O'Brien, Today, and others.

Penn & Teller had national tours throughout the 1990s, gaining critical praise. They have also made television guest appearances on Babylon 5 (as the comedy team Rebo and Zooty), The Drew Carey Show, a few episodes of Hollywood Squares from 1998 until 2004, ABC's Muppets Tonight, FOX's The Bernie Mac Show, an episode of the game show Fear Factor on NBC, NBC's The West Wing, in a two-part episode of the final season of ABC's Home Improvement in 1998, four episodes during season 1 of Sabrina, the Teenage Witch in 1996, NBC's Las Vegas, and Fox's The Simpsons episodes "Hello Gutter, Hello Fadder" and "The Great Simpsina" and the Futurama film Futurama: Into the Wild Green Yonder in 2009. They appeared in the music video for Katy Perry's 2009 single "Waking Up in Vegas", in which they are thrown out of a hotel room by Perry.

Penn and Teller made an appearance on Bill Nye the Science Guy season 2,  episode 7 - "Light Optics".

From 2003 to 2010, their Showtime television show Bullshit! took a skeptical look at psychics, religion, the pseudoscientific, conspiracy theories, and the paranormal. It has featured critical segments on gun control, astrology, Feng Shui, environmental issues, PETA, weight loss, the Americans with Disabilities Act, and the war on drugs.

The pair have written several books about magic, including Penn & Teller's Cruel Tricks For Dear Friends, Penn & Teller's How to Play with Your Food, and Penn & Teller's How to Play in Traffic. Since 2001, Penn & Teller have performed in Las Vegas at the Rio All Suite Hotel and Casino.

Penn Jillette hosted a weekday one-hour talk show on Infinity Broadcasting's Free FM radio network from January 3, 2006, to March 2, 2007, with cohost Michael Goudeau. He also hosted the game show Identity, which debuted on December 18, 2006, on NBC.

Their television series Penn & Teller Tell a Lie premiered on the Discovery Channel on October 5, 2011.

Since 2010, Penn & Teller have hosted Penn & Teller: Fool Us, originally on ITV, moving to The CW in 2015.

Penn & Teller credit magician and skeptical activist James Randi for their own careers. During an interview at TAM! 2012, Penn stated that Randi's book Flim-Flam! was an early influence on him, and said that "If not for Randi there would not be Penn & Teller as we are today."

In early 2022, Penn and Teller competed in season seven of The Masked Singer as “Hydra” of Team Bad. Because of Hydra's three-legged design and large size, the costume had to be assembled back stage while "Hydra" had to be wheeled out on a special platform to get it to and from the stage. Penn operated the left side of "Hydra" while Teller operated the right side of "Hydra". They were eliminated on the week of April 6 where it was shown that Teller used a puppet of a rabbit in a hat to "operate" the central head of "Hydra". Teller was given most of the singing due to how rarely people hear his voice and the possibility of people recognizing Penn's voice. Nicole Byer, who was the guest panelist of the night, successfully guessed the duo to be underneath the "Hydra" masks.

Off-stage relationship
The duo respect each other as business partners and enjoy working together, but have little in common besides magic and skepticism. As a result of their drastically different lifestyles and interests, they rarely socialize or interact when they are not working.

However, Jillette has also said, in a video where he and Teller responded to questions from members of Reddit and also in a video interview for Big Think, that while they share few interests outside magic, Teller is his best friend and his children treat Teller as a close relative. He stated that while most entertainment partnerships such as Martin and Lewis and Lennon–McCartney were based on a deep affection for each other that lends to a certain volatility when things go wrong, their business relationship and friendship is based on a respect for each other. Teller has made similar statements. In an NPR interview, Teller said their disagreements often lead to better artistic decisions because they bring out new ideas and expand the range of discussion.

Honors

On April 5, 2013, Penn & Teller were honored with the 2,494th star on the Hollywood Walk of Fame for their achievement in the category of Live Performance. Their star is a few steps away from the star of Harry Houdini and down the street from The Magic Castle. However, they were refused membership of The Magic Circle due to their tendencies to reveal how magic tricks are done during performances.

They are recipients of a Writers Guild of America Award for Penn & Teller: Bullshit!. They have been nominated for 11 Emmy Awards winning one, in 1985, for Penn & Teller Go Public. In 2017, Penn & Teller: Fool Us was nominated for a Critic's Choice Award.

In 2003, Penn & Teller received the Emperor Has No Clothes Award, which celebrates "plain speaking" on the shortcomings of religion by public figures. In 2005, they were awarded the Richard Dawkins Award, an award given to people who raised public consciousness of atheism in the previous year. They are also recipients of a Hugh M. Hefner First Amendment Award.

In 2014, they were nominated for a BAFTA Award for their documentary Tim's Vermeer.

For their contributions to the West End production Magic Goes Wrong with Mischief Theatre, they were nominated for a 2020 Olivier Award.

Tricks

Penn & Teller material varies from light-hearted gags such as graphic tricks and clever pranks to tackling issues through political satire and by exposing frauds. Many of their effects in their past relied heavily on shock appeal and fantasy violence, although presented in a humorous manner. Some of their more daring tricks included Teller hanging upside-down over a bed of spikes in a straitjacket, Teller submerged in a glass tank of water, and Teller being run over by an 18-wheel tractor-trailer. Penn & Teller will often present tricks that they initially appear to have botched, in the "trick gone wrong" vein.

Sometimes, the pair will claim to reveal a secret of how a magic trick is done, but those tricks are usually invented by the duo for the sole purpose of "exposing" the method to the audience, and therefore designed with more spectacular and theatrical methods than would be practical in a "conventional" magic trick. For example, during their NBC Off the Deep End special, an escape act was performed where Teller was placed into a wooden box that was then put into shark-infested waters. The live audience believed Teller to be inside, but the television audience was shown that Teller escaped the box through a trapdoor in the bottom before it was placed in the water. He continued to read a magazine and eat a snack while awaiting his cue. Often a trick will be presented as if to explain it to the audience, only for a more elaborate version to be performed. In a segment of Bullshit!, Penn & Teller demonstrate the illusion of sawing a woman in half, only for the saw to fall and "accidentally" cut the woman in half again.

Penn & Teller perform their own adaptation of the famous bullet catch illusion. Each simultaneously fires a gun at the other through small panes of glass and then "catches" the other's bullet in his mouth. They also have an assortment of card tricks in their repertoire, virtually all of them involving the force of the Three of Clubs on an unsuspecting audience member as this card is easy for viewers to identify on television cameras.

The duo will sometimes perform tricks that discuss the intellectual underpinnings of magic. One of their routines, titled "Magician vs. Juggler,"  features Teller performing card tricks while Penn juggles and delivers a monologue on the difference between the two: jugglers start as socially aware children who go outside and learn juggling with other children; magicians are misfits who stay in the house and teach themselves magic tricks out of spite.

In one of their most politically charged tricks, they make an American flag seem to disappear by wrapping it in a copy of the United States Bill of Rights, and apparently setting the flag on fire, so that "the flag is gone but the Bill of Rights remains". The routine may also feature the "Chinese bill of rights", presented as a transparent piece of acetate. They normally end the trick by restoring the unscathed flag to its starting place on the flagpole; however, on a TV guest appearance on The West Wing, this final part was omitted. The methods of the trick were revealed by the duo in an episode of Fool Us.

One trick involves a powered nail gun with a quantity of missing nails from the series of nails in its magazine. Penn begins by firing several apparently real nails into a board in front of him. He then proceeds to fire the nail gun into the palm of his hand several times, while suffering no injuries. His pattern builds as he oscillates between firing blanks into his hand and firing nails into the board, and fires one blank into Teller's crotch. Near the end of the trick, he says that it is a trick and that he and Teller believe that it is morally wrong to do things on stage that are really dangerous—it makes the audience complicit in unnecessary human risk.

A trick introduced in 2010 is a modern version of the bag escape, replacing the traditional sack with a black trash bag apparently filled with helium. Teller is placed in the bag which is then pumped full of helium and sealed by an audience member. For the escape, the audience is blinded by a bright light for a second and when they are able to see again, Teller has escaped from the bag and Penn is holding it, still full of helium, above his head, before releasing it to float to the ceiling. The duo had hoped to put the trick in their mini-tour in London; however, it was first shown to the public in their Las Vegas show on August 18, 2010. In June 2011, Penn & Teller performed this trick for the first time in the United Kingdom on their ITV show Fool Us.

In one of their TV appearances on The Tonight Show, they performed a trick that involved all members of the audience. Each person received four cards which were torn apart and "mixed" so as to have two out of the eight halves selected in a process that seems random, as each person has freedom of moves throughout the process. Yet in the end, everyone ends up with two halves of the same card. Some mathematicians made a deep analysis of the trick and generalized it so it would work with any number of initial cards, using mathematical induction; their complete analysis was published in the Journal of Magic Research.

Politics and personal lives
On Bullshit!, the duo described their social and political views as libertarian. In addition to disbelief in the paranormal and pseudoscience, Penn & Teller also take a view of doubtfulness to government authority. In various episodes of their show, they have heavily criticized both the Internal Revenue Service and the Environmental Protection Agency, as well as taken stances against circumcision and gun control, and in support of ideas such as freedom to eat fast food, private property, and lower taxes. Penn & Teller are both H. L. Mencken research fellows with the Cato Institute, a libertarian think-tank and research organization.

Penn & Teller have shown support for the Brights movement and are now listed on the movement's website under the Enthusiastic Brights section.

They have described themselves as teetotalers. Their book, Penn & Teller's How to Play in Traffic, explains that they avoid alcohol, drugs, and caffeine, although they do smoke cigarettes in some videos.

Filmography

Television

Books
Penn & Teller:
 Penn & Teller's How to Play in Traffic (1997)
 Penn & Teller's How to Play with Your Food (1992)
 Penn & Teller's Cruel Tricks for Dear Friends (1989)
Penn without Teller:
 Sock (2004)
 How to Cheat Your Friends at Poker: The Wisdom of Dickie Richard (2006, ; Co-author: Mickey D. Lynn)
 God, No!: Signs You May Already Be an Atheist and Other Magical Tales (2011)
 Every Day is an Atheist Holiday!: More Magical Tales from the Author of God, No! (2012) 
 Presto!: How I Made Over 100 Pounds Disappear and Other Magical Tales (2016)
Teller without Penn:
 When I'm Dead All This Will Be Yours: Joe Teller—A Portrait by His Kid (2000)

Other media

Music
 "Penn & Teller Present: Music to Look at Boxes By" (With Mike "Jonesy" Jones)
 "It's Tricky" by Run–D.M.C. (Penn & Teller shown throughout the video and at the end appear to take over the persona of Run–D.M.C.)
 "Something to Believe In" by The Ramones (Penn & Teller are seen supporting the fictitious "Hands Across Your Face" charity)
 "Waking up in Vegas" by Katy Perry (Penn & Teller are kicked out of their hotel room by Perry and her boyfriend.)
 "This Time I've Got It" by The Great Tomsoni & Co. (Penn & Teller in lab coats, Penn playing bass guitar)
 "Donna Everywhere" by Too Much Joy (Teller directed the video which features the band spending their entire budget as the video plays out. Teller features as a security guard and Penn as the band's representative)

Video games
 Penn & Teller's Smoke and Mirrors 1995 – Absolute Entertainment for Sega CD & 3DO (unreleased)
 Steven Spielberg's Director's Chair 1996 – Knowledge Adventure for PC & Mac – As Leroy Paine and Sigmund Terrore
 Sabrina, the Teenage Witch: Spellbound 1998 – Simon & Schuster for PC – Voices for Drell & Skippy
Penn & Teller VR: Frankly Unfair, Unkind, Unnecessary, & Underhanded 2019  – Gearbox Software for PC
 Borderlands 3 2019 – Gearbox Software for PS4, Xbox One & PC - Voices for Pain & Terror

The 1995 video game Penn & Teller's Smoke and Mirrors featured a mini-game called Desert Bus in which the player drove a bus route between Tucson and Las Vegas. Once reaching the destination, the player gets one point and, if desired, can then drive the return route. The game was considered by some to be long and boring yet found a cult audience.
The entire set of games was actually more of a collection of tricks and pranks, rather than games meant to be actually good to play. Both in-game and in interviews Penn states that Desert Bus was a reaction to the controversy of violent video-games going on at the time. In essence making fun of this controversy, by creating a simulator "stupefyingly like reality".
 
The game has since been used in an annual charity event called "Desert Bus for Hope" run by the Canadian internet comedy troupe LoadingReadyRun. The fundraiser involves members of LoadingReadyRun (and occasional guests) playing the game and streaming that live online, while interviewing celebrities via Skype and accepting challenges for the audience, with all proceeds being donated to Child's Play. On November 14, 2011, an iOS port of Desert Bus was created and released in the iTunes Store. The game was developed in conjunction with the Desert Bus For Hope event and all profits from the game are donated to charity.

Attractions
"Penn & Teller: New(kd) Las Vegas 3D" was a 2012 Halloween Horror Nights maze collaborated at Universal Orlando. It featured a backstory of Las Vegas being destroyed by Penn & Teller's latest magic trick involving a nuclear warhead gone wrong.

Theatre 
 Magic Goes Wrong - a 2019 comedy play in collaboration with Mischief Theatre following their highly-successful West End and Broadway hit The Play That Goes Wrong.

References

External links

 

American comedy duos
American magicians
American skeptics
American atheism activists
Critics of alternative medicine
Critics of creationism
Las Vegas shows
Magician duos
Nevada Libertarians
Place of birth missing (living people)
Academy of Magical Arts Magician of the Year winners
Academy of Magical Arts Performing Fellowship winners